The red-shouldered spinetail (Synallaxis hellmayri) is a species of bird in the ovenbird family Furnariidae. It is endemic to the Caatinga region of north-eastern Brazil. It is threatened by habitat loss.

This species was formerly considered monotypic within the genus Gyalophylax but molecular phylogenetic studies show that it is embedded within Synallaxis.

References

Synallaxis
Birds of the Caatinga
Endemic birds of Brazil
red-shouldered spinetail
Taxonomy articles created by Polbot